"I've Been Hurt" is a popular single by the Tams, Guy Darrell, and Bill Deal and the Rhondels. Written by Ray Whitley, it was originally released in 1965.

Darrell's cover became a favourite on the Northern soul scene in the UK in 1966, belatedly reaching number 12 on the UK Singles Chart in August 1973.

References

1965 singles
1965 songs
ABC Records singles
Songs written by Ray Whitley (songwriter)
Northern soul songs